Bal Krishna (born 11 December 1998) is an Indian cricketer. He made his Twenty20 debut on 16 January 2021, for Jharkhand in the 2020–21 Syed Mushtaq Ali Trophy. He made his List A debut on 20 February 2021, for Jharkhand in the 2020–21 Vijay Hazare Trophy.

References

External links
 

1998 births
Living people
Indian cricketers
Jharkhand cricketers
Place of birth missing (living people)